An axe is an implement with a blade, used as a tool and a weapon.

Axe may also refer to:

Comic Books
 A.X.E.: Judgment Day, a crossover from Marvel Comics; tie-in comics only refer to it as "A.X.E."

Film
 Axe (film), a 1977 American horror film
 The Axe (film), a 2005 film

Music
 Axé (music), a form of Brazilian popular music
 Axe (band), an American rock band
 Axe (other band), a psychedelic rock band

Rivers
 River Axe (Bristol Channel)
 River Axe (Lyme Bay)

Sports
 Axe (gamer), American esports player
 Paul Bunyan's Axe, a prize in college football
 Stanford Axe, a college football trophy

Transport
 Mahindra Axe, a 4WD military vehicle
 AirExplore's ICAO code

Other uses
 Axe (brand), a brand of men's grooming products
 AXE method (chemistry), a method to determine the geometry of simple molecules
 aXe Spectral Extraction, astronomical spectroscopic data extraction software
 AXE telephone exchange, of telephone exchange by Ericsson
 Glaze3D or Axe, a graphics card
 The Axe, a 1966 novel by Ludvík Vaculík

People with the surname
 David Axe, military correspondent
 Lisa Axe, American chemical engineer
 Samuel Axe, English privateer during the early 17th century

Fictional
 Sam Axe, a character in the television series Burn Notice

People with the nickname
 David Axelrod (political consultant) or "Axe", advisor to US President Barack Obama
 Martin Axenrot or "Axe", drummer for Opeth and Bloodbath
 Larry Hennig or "The Axe", retired professional wrestler
 Jeffrey Williamson or "Axe", professional Super Smash Bros. Melee player

See also
 Alpha Chi Sigma (ΑΧΣ), a professional fraternity specializing in the field of chemistry
 AX (disambiguation)
 Axes (disambiguation)

Lists of people by nickname
ru:Секира (значения)